This is a list of broadcast television stations serving cities in the Canadian province of New Brunswick.

See also
List of television stations in Canada
Lists of television stations in Atlantic Canada
Media in Canada

References

New Brunswick
 
Television stations